A (A-sharp; also called la dièse) is the eleventh semitone of the solfege. In some countries (where B is known as H) it is informally called B.

This note lies a chromatic semitone above A and a diatonic semitone below B, thus being enharmonic to si bémol or B (B-flat).

When calculated in equal temperament with a reference of A above middle C as 440 Hz, the frequency of the A above middle C is approximately 466.164 Hz. See pitch (music) for a discussion of historical variations in frequency.

Designation by octave

Scales

Common scales beginning on A
 A major: A B C D E F G A
 A natural minor: A B C D E F G A
 A harmonic minor: A B C D E F G A
 A melodic minor ascending: A B C D E F G A
 A melodic minor descending: A G F E D C B A

Diatonic scales
 A Ionian: A B C D E F G A
 A Dorian: A B C D E F G A
 A Phrygian: A B C D E F G A
 A Lydian: A B C D E F G A
 A Mixolydian: A B C D E F G A
 A Aeolian: A B C D E F G A
 A Locrian: A B C D E F G A

Jazz melodic minor
 A ascending melodic minor: A B C D E F G A
 A Dorian ♭2: A B C D E F G A
 A Lydian augmented: A B C D E F G A
 A Lydian dominant: A B C D E F G A
 A Mixolydian ♭6: A B C D E F G A
 A Locrian ♮2: A B C D E F G A
 A altered: A B C D E F G A

See also
 B♭ (musical note), an enharmonic note
 Piano key frequencies
 A-sharp major
 A-sharp minor
 Root (chord)

References

Musical notes